Uttam Nagar is a residential area situated in West Delhi. Uttam Nagar has the Pincode 110059. Uttam Nagar mainly consists of several sub towns that are completely urbanized. Since the advent of the Delhi Metro in the area, the population has increased much faster here. The proximity with Metro, Airport and Gurgaon makes this area special.

Metro connectivity

Delhi Metro's Blue Line (Dwarka Sector-21-Vaishali/Noida City Center) which starts from Dwarka, connects Uttam Nagar to Connaught Place, Pragati Maidan, Anand Vihar ISBT and Vaishali. The line is being extended to the Airport via Dwarka. Uttam Nagar has mainly Four Metro Stations named Dwarka Mor, Nawada, Uttam Nagar East and Uttam Nagar West.

Other modes of transport

In all parts, cycle rickshaws and auto rickshaws can be found easily. E-Rickshaws (Motor-powered low-height 4-seater rickshaws) are very common these days which run in fixed routes at cheap fares on a sharing basis, usually takes 10 rupees per head. Gramin Sewa Autos ply on main Road from Dwarka Mor to Uttam Nagar East.

Notable people 
 Virat Kohli
 Neha Kakkar, Singer
 Sandeep Rajora Engineers

Points of interest
 Potter's Colony, Kumhar Colony
 Mini Qutub Minar in Hastsal village
 The Shikargah (hunting lodge) of sh Prithviraj Chauhan in Hastsal village
 An old peer baba mazaar in Bindapur Village
 Arya Samaj Road (Fashion Street) 
Kali Ghata (50 plus old sweet shop)
Hastal Road [Wholesale Kiryana Mkt.]
 Shukkar Bazar [Retail Market & weekly Market]
 Bindapur Road Nanhey Park [Wholesale Kiryana Market]

References
Uttam Nagar Delhi Local Classified

Cities and towns in West Delhi district